Anahit Maschyan (November 9, 1900 – January 3, 1989) was an Armenian theater and film actress. People's Artist of the Armenian SSR (1950).

Biography 
Anahit Maschyan was born in 1900 in Alexandrapol, Erivan Governorate, Russian Empire. 1919-1925 studied at the Armenian dramatic studio in Moscow. 1928-1929, she was an actor at Leninakan Dramatic Theater, 1930-1945 Yerevan State Youth Theatre, 1945-1958 Sundukyan State Academic Theatre of Yerevan,

Filmography

Theatre Roles

Awards
 People's Artist of the Armenian SSR (1950).
 Medal "For Labor Distinction" (27.06.1956).

Family
Anahit Maschyan  was married to Armenian actor Armen Gulakyan.

References

External links

1900 births
1989 deaths
Soviet Armenians
Armenian actresses